Wilt "Tallpree" Cambridge (born 29 July 1973) is a Grenadian soca artist.

He initially began performing as a reggae dancehall artist in the late 1980s and made the switch to becoming a soca artist the late 90s. His first stage name was Mr. Evilus, but by the time he began singing the popular "Jab Jab" – infused music soca enthusiasts have come to expect from him, he changed his name to Tallpree.

In 2000, Tallpree built a massive audience in the Spicemas Grenada Carnival season with the soca song "Grave, Jail, Hospital," which was named the Road March (most popular/played song) that year.

Tallpree continues to perform popular soca tunes all around the world, and in 2011, he was named Grenadian Cultural Ambassador.

EPs

 Jab Love (FOX FUSE, 2017)

References 

Soca musicians
1973 births
Living people